Pemberton Tramway Company operated as a tourist railway in Pemberton in Western Australia.

The company controls the southern section of the former Northcliffe Branch railway, from Lyall to Northcliffe.

trams ran south from the old WAGR railway station at Pemberton to the Cascades. Previously, tram services operated as far as Northcliffe, and steam-hauled train services, using WAGR V class 1213, operated to Eastbrook and Lyall.

Pemberton Tramway ceased operations on 6 February 2023.

References

External links
 Pemberton Tramway Company official website

Pemberton, Western Australia
Rail transport in Western Australia
Heritage railways in Australia